The Lord Howe silvereye (Zosterops lateralis tephropleurus), also known as the Lord Howe white-eye, Lord Howe Island white-eye or, locally, as the "Little Grinnell", is a small bird in the white-eye family, Zosteropidae. It is a subspecies of the silvereye (Zosterops lateralis), though sometimes considered a full species. It is endemic to Lord Howe Island in the Tasman Sea, part of New South Wales, Australia.

Description
The Lord Howe silvereye is sometimes treated as a full species. It differs from the nominate subspecies by being more robust, with larger feet and claws, a longer and heavier bill, with much olive-green on flanks, rump and lower back, and with canary yellow under-tail coverts.

Distribution and habitat
The Lord Howe silvereye is restricted to Lord Howe Island, where it widely distributed through the native subtropical rainforest as well as around homes and gardens.

Behaviour

Breeding
The bird builds a small cup-shaped nest of palm fibre, grass and spider webs, in which it lays a clutch of 2-4 small eggs in spring and summer.

Feeding
The silvereyes glean insects from leaves and flowers, as well as eating small seeds, nectar and fruits, particularly guava and will come into gardens and houses, in which people may feed them mince meat and food scraps.

Status and conservation
The population of the Lord Howe silvereye has been estimated at about 5,000 breeding birds and stable. It is considered Vulnerable because of the restricted size of the population and area of its distribution.

Notes

References
 Garnett, Stephen T.; & Crowley, Gabriel M. (2000). The Action Plan for Australian Birds 2000. Environment Australia: Canberra. 
 Hindwood, K.A. (1940). Birds of Lord Howe Island. Emu 40: 1-86.
 Hutton, Ian. (1991). Birds of Lord Howe Island: Past and Present. Author: Lord Howe Island.
 Schodde, R.; & Mason, I.J. (1999). The Directory of Australian Birds: Passerines. CSIRO Publishing: Melbourne.

External links
Profile - Saving NSW threatened species

Birds described in 1855
Birds of Lord Howe Island
Endemic fauna of Australia
Zosterops